Simon Cook may refer to:

Simon Cook (English cricketer) (born 1977), English cricketer
Simon Cook (Australian cricketer) (born 1972), Australian cricketer
Simon S. Cook (1831–1892), Canadian lumber merchant and political figure
Simon Cook (actor), British actor and politician

See also
Simon Cooke, New Zealand sailor